Brave 3: Battle in Brazil (also known as Brave 3) was a mixed martial arts event held live by Brave Combat Federation on Saturday March 18, 2017 at the Max Rosenmann Arena in São José dos Pinhais, Curitiba metropolitan area, Brazil. The event was broadcast live online and locally through Bahrain TV, ABS-CBN Sports and Action, Combate and OSN Sports.

Background

Brave 3: Battle in Brazil was Brave Combat Federation's third card and the first to be held outside Bahrain, where the company headquarters is located.

The event was the second international Mixed Martial Arts fight night to take place in the Curitiba Metropolitan Area, after UFC 198 on May 14, 2016, and the first to be held in the municipality of São José dos Pinhais.

The Brazilian card was first announced during Brave 2: Dynasty post-fight press conference in Bahrain. The original date was February 25, 2017, but the event was then rescheduled to March 18, 2017.

Brave 3 was originally supposed to be headlined by the fight between the Brazilian rivals Lucas "Mineiro" Martins and Paulo "Bananada" Gonçalves. The promotion of the main event was very intense, with the opponents trading shots publicly and involved even local celebrities, like MasterChef Brasil judge Henrique Fogaça and Brazilian model and TV host Ana Hickmann.

During the fight week, though, Paulo Bananada suffered a knee injury and was forced to withdraw from the fight
. To Paulo's place, Brave promoted Mexico's Fabian Galvan, who was originally scheduled to face Willian Lima on the preliminary card. A new opponent for Willian was cogitated, but the promotion ended up pulling the Brazilian from the card.

Julio César "Morceguinho" was supposed to face Nate Landwehr in a main card featured bout, but Landwehr pulled from the fight due to a last minute injury. For his spot, Brave brought Brazil's Fernando Colman and made the fight a Catchweight bout in 150 lb (68 kg).

Walel Watson was originally scheduled to face the former Bellator fighter Diego Marlon in a Bantamweight bout. Two weeks before the fight, Diego was pulled from the fight and the former Titan FC contender Felipe Efrain took his place against Watson.

India's Pawan Singh was supposed to fight USA's James Pou in a preliminary lightweight bout but both athletes were considered unable to compete as per the Brazilian Athletic Commission medical protocol and the fight was then canceled.

Broadcast

The event was broadcast internationally online, through Brave's official website and YouTube channel, for free. In addition, the card was also broadcast in Bahrain through Bahrain TV, Middle East through OSN Sports, Brazil through Combate and Asia through ABS-CBN Sports and Action.

Broadcasting team

Play-by-play commentator: Cyrus Fees
Color Commentator: Frankie Edgar
Cage announcer: Carlos Kremer

Results

Bonus Awards
Fight of the Night: Marcos Pirata x Jeremy Smith
Knockout of the Night: Felipe Efrain
Submission of the Night: Lucas Martins

References

Mixed martial arts events